Phaeochora is a genus of fungi within the family Phaeochoraceae.

Species
As accepted by Species Fungorum;
Phaeochora indaya 
Phaeochora livistonae 
Phaeochora sphaerotheca 
Phaeochora steinheilii 

Former species;
 P.  acrocomiae  = Camarotella acrocomiae, Phyllachoraceae
 P. calamigena  = Malthomyces calamigenus, Phyllachoraceae
 P. chamaeropis  = Phaeochora steinheilii, Phaeochoraceae
 P. densa  = Sphaerodothis densa, Phyllachoraceae
 P. guilielmae  = Sphaerodothis guilielmae, Phyllachoraceae
 P. mauritiae  = Serenomyces mauritiae, Phaeochoraceae
 P. neowashingtoniae  = Phaeochoropsis neowashingtoniae, Phaeochoraceae

References

External links 

Sordariomycetes genera
Phyllachorales